The brown-breasted kingfisher (Halcyon gularis) is a tree kingfisher endemic to the Philippines, where it is widely distributed. This kingfisher is a resident over much of its range. 

It was previously considered a subspecies of the white-throated kingfisher (H. smyrnensis), but was split as a distinct species by the IUCN Red List and BirdLife International in 2014, and the International Ornithological Congress followed suit in 2022.

References

Collar 2011b; Allen 2020; HBW/Birdlife
Gill F, D Donsker & P Rasmussen  (Eds). 2022. IOC World Bird List (v12.1). doi :  10.14344/IOC.ML.12.1.

brown-breasted kingfisher
Endemic birds of the Philippines
brown-breasted kingfisher
brown-breasted kingfisher